Beleg is a village in Somogy county, Hungary.

Etymology
Its name derives from the given name Biluk. He could be the owner of the village.

History
According to László Szita the settlement was completely Hungarian in the 18th century.

External links 
   OFFICIAL HOMEPAGE OF BELEG (Hungarian)
 Street map (Hungarian)

References 

Populated places in Somogy County